Point Heathcote (Goolugatup in Noongar) is a geographic feature located on the south east part of Melville Water on Swan River. It is located in Applecross, a suburb of Perth, Western Australia.

History
The area was named after George Gage Heathcote, son of Admiral Sir Henry Heathcote, a midshipman on HMS Success, who is said to have been the first European to land there. It was one of the landing and camp sites of Captain James Stirling during his exploration of the Swan River in April 1827. Point Heathcote was considered as a site for the capital city by Stirling, before selecting its current position.

Prior to European settlement, the area was known to the Noongar indigenous people as Goolugatup. It was a permanent camping area, and also used for initiation ceremonies.

Hospital

Point Heathcote was the site of the Point Heathcote Mental Reception Home, later known as Heathcote Hospital, for the treatment of patients with mental illness. The buildings were designed under the supervision of William Hardwick, who at the time was Principal Architect of the Public Works Department in Western Australia. The need for a new facility arose due to over-crowding conditions at Claremont Mental Hospital. Following a report on the inadequacies of facilities at Claremont in 1924, a  site was purchased from the Catholic Church at Point Heathcote.

The Point Heathcote Mental Reception Home was constructed as a 'home for the reception of recoverable patients, and not for senile, epileptic, or mentally deficient patients'. It provided accommodation for 38 male and 38 female patients, in two separate wards with a central administration block connected to the wards by covered walkways. A two-storey accommodation building, housing 36 nurses, was also constructed on the western portion of the site. In 1928 a  Water Tower/Clock Tower was designed by the then Principal Architect, John Tait. Point Heathcote Mental Reception Home was completed by early 1929 at a final cost of 55,675 pounds. The Lieutenant Governor, Sir Robert McMillan, officially opened the centre on 22 February 1929.

In 1940 a new treatment block, "Swan House" was constructed on the site, accommodating a further 26 patients. It was designed by the Government Architect, Albert Ernest (Paddy) Clare and constructed at a cost of 15,000 pounds.

By 1994 the function as a hospital had ceased, and various ideas were put forward for the site. In 2000 the hospital and grounds were designated a heritage precinct. The land, together with the heritage buildings, is also protected by the heritage agreement, which is registered as a memorial on the land title.

See also
Applecross
Waylen Bay

References 

Swan River (Western Australia)
Places of Noongar significance
Applecross, Western Australia